Prosopocera fryi is a species of beetle in the family Cerambycidae. It was described by Murray in 1871. It is known from Nigeria and the Democratic Republic of the Congo. It contains the varietas Prosopocera fryi var. ochreomaculata.

References

Prosopocerini
Beetles described in 1871